The Neuse River Trail is a  long paved greenway located in the Raleigh area of North Carolina, running along the banks of the Neuse River from Falls Lake Dam to the town of Clayton. The route passes through the jurisdictions of Raleigh, Wake Forest, Knightdale, and Clayton in Wake and Johnston counties. The Neuse River Greenway trail is part of the Capital Area Greenway system as well as the Mountains-to-Sea Trail that crosses North Carolina from the Great Smoky Mountains to the Outer Banks. Open to both cyclists and pedestrians, the Neuse River Trail is the longest greenway trail in North Carolina and the longest paved trail between northern Virginia and western Georgia.

The Neuse River Trail is a part of the East Coast Greenway, a 3,000 mile long system of trails connecting Maine to Florida.

Route
The Neuse River Trail is split into seven sections, from North to South:
 Falls Lake Dam to Horseshoe Farm Park
 Horseshoe Farm Park to Buffaloe Road Athletic Park
 Buffaloe Road Athletic Park to Milburnie Dam
 Milburnie Dam to Anderson Point Park
 Anderson Point Park to Auburn Knightdale Road
 Auburn Knightdale Road to County Line
 County Line to Legend Park in Clayton

Bridges
The Neuse River Trail is notable for its pedestrian bridges that span the Neuse River. Two suspension bridges span the river; one at Skycrest Road and the other at Louisburg Road. Other bridges over the Neuse River feature a steel truss design, such as the Milburnie Dam bridge. Bridges over wetland and creeks are constructed out of wood.

History
In 1976, the Raleigh City Council adopted the Capital Area Greenway System plan of which the Neuse River Corridor was a spine. In 1996, the Raleigh completed the Neuse River Regional Park Master Plan.

The major recommendations included in the Neuse River Plan:

 The preservation of the full width of the floodplain along the Neuse River. The plan calls for the corridor to include the 100 year flood plan or extend ) from the riverbank, whichever is greater. 
 The development of adjoining upland park areas at a spacing of 2 to 3 miles to provide various recreation opportunities and access points to the river and trail.

When Raleigh approved the Neuse River Regional Park Master Plan in 1996 only a  stretch of trail existed along the Hedingham neighborhood. Since then the city has acquired over 2,000 acres of land along the Neuse river for use as greenway as well as nine parcels of land for future parks.

In 2003, Raleigh voters approved a Parks and Recreation Bond Referendum that included $1.474 million for the development of the Upper Neuse Trail. In addition to the City's funding, Federal Enhancement funds of $893,000 and American Reinvestment and Recovery Act funds of $3.25 million were acquired by the Raleigh.

In November 2011, the first  stretch of the Upper Neuse River Greenway opened from Falls Lake Dam to the WRAL Soccer Center. In April 2013, a 20 mile stretch from Horseshoe Farm Park to the Johnston County line officially opened. The last  section of the greenway, at the Horseshoe Farm riverbend, was completed in 2014.   It is a connector between the Upper Neuse River section and the rest of the greenway.

The town of Clayton's sections of the greenway include the  Sam's Branch Greenway and the  Clayton River Walk on the Neuse. Additional sections will be constructed as funding becomes available.

On October 13, 2022, a spree shooting occurred at and near the greenway. A total of five people were killed, and two others were injured.

Gallery

See also 
Neuse River
Capital Area Greenway
Mountains-to-Sea Trail
WRAL Soccer Center
Cliffs of the Neuse State Park

References

External links

  - Official Neuse River Greenway Trail website
  - Capital Area Greenway System Map

Rail trails in North Carolina
Protected areas of Wake County, North Carolina
East Coast Greenway
Bike paths in North Carolina
Transportation in Wake County, North Carolina